Django the Condemned (aka Django the Honorable Killer or Outlaw of Red River) is a 1965 English-speaking Spanish Western movie starring George Montgomery and directed by Maury Dexter.

Storyline
Pat O'Brien (aka Django or Ray Reese) is an outlaw from Texas who's accused of killing his wife, who now, as a fugitive from justice residing in Mexico, finds himself as an officer in the Mexican army, an underling under General Miguel Camargo (José Nieto), also a known bandit, and his job is to protect the General's property from Espada (Miguel del Castillo) and his bandit gang. Django is accused of killing the nephew of a wealthy land owner named Don Cristibal Riaño (Jesús Tordesillas), an emperor Maximiliano's supporter, and when Camargo begins to show interest in Francesca Riaño (Elisa Montés), a young widow living in Riano's house, he also finds himself accused of the murder.

After extensive inquiries, O'Brien, or Django, manages to piece together the story of the nephew's death, and discovers that Riano himself is the culprit. Espada's bandit gang strikes again, as Django succeeds in killing most of them in his defense of the General's property.

Finally, Django gets the girl (Francesca), with whom he's fallen in love with, as Camargo left to look after himself in the future.

Cast
 George Montgomery as Ray Reese/Pat O'Brien / Django
 Elisa Montés as Francisca Riaño
 José Nieto as General Miguel Camargo 
 Jesús Tordesillas as Don Cristobal Riaño 
 Miguel del Castillo as Espada
 Ana Maria Custodio s Senora Camargo 
 Gloria Cámara as Marta Camargo 
 Ricardo Valle as Alfredo Riaño 
 José Villasante as Camargo stableman 
 Carmen Porcel as Riaño's housekeeper 
 Frank Braña as Paco 
 Rafael Vaquero as Espada bandit
 Rafael Hernandez (as Ralph Baldwyn) as Father of slain girl
 Antonio Orengo as Lopez, Riaño stableman
 Juanito Ramirez as Villager 
 Luis Montez as Rafael Ibáñez
 Luis Martinez Carvaja as Victor Bayo

Production
The film was originally called Outlaw of Red River. It was a co production between Robert L. Lippert's company and a Spanish company -
Lippert provided above the line costs and the key creatives, the Spanish provided below the line costs. George Montgomery agreed to star. Lippert insisted his mistress, Margia Dean, be cast, but Maury Dexter refused.

Ken Annakin was filming Battle of the Bulge in Spain at the same time and cast Montgomery in that film once he heard he would be in the country.

References

External links

1965 films
Spanish Western (genre) films
1960s English-language films
Films shot in Almería
1965 Western (genre) films
English-language Spanish films
Films directed by Maury Dexter